Norpoth is a surname. Notable people with the surname include:

Harald Norpoth (born 1942), West German middle and long distance runner
Helmut Norpoth (born 1943), American political scientist